Castelmur Castle may refer to:
Castelmur Castle (Stampa) or Palazzo Castelmur in the Swiss village of Stampa in the Bregaglia municipality
Castelmur Castle (Bondo) an earlier castle in the Swiss village of Bondo in the Bregaglia municipality